WSG Wannabe is a seasonal South Korean supergroup formed on the MBC variety show Hangout with Yoo, and was a female counterpart of MSG Wannabe which formed in the previous year. The group, which officially formed on May 26, 2022, consists of twelve members (ranging from actresses to singers to K-pop idols): Yoon Eun-hye, Navi, Lee Bo-ram, Kota (Sunny Hill), Park Jin-joo, Jo Hyun-ah (Urban Zakapa), Sole, Soyeon (Laboum), Eom Ji-yoon, Kwon Jin-ah, Hynn and Jung Ji-so. The group released their debut album and tracks on July 9, 2022.

Members

Gaya-G
 Lee Bo-ram
 Soyeon (Laboum)
 Hynn
 Jung Ji-so

Sa-Fire
 Navi
 Sole
 Eom Ji-yoon
 Kwon Jin-ah

Oasiso
 Yoon Eun-hye
 Kota (Sunny Hill)
 Park Jin-joo
 Jo Hyun-ah (Urban Zakapa)

Discography

Singles

Awards and nominations

See also
 Hangout with Yoo
 MSG Wannabe

Notes

References

External links
 Official website 
 Official YouTube Channel 

2022 establishments in South Korea
K-pop music groups
Musical groups established in 2022
Musical groups from Seoul
Supergroups (music)
South Korean contemporary R&B musical groups